Krøderen (also Krøderfjorden)  is a lake in the municipality of Krødsherad in Buskerud, Norway.

Summary
The lake has a surface area of 42.88 km² and a depth of 119 meters. The primary river flowing into it is Hallingdalselva to the north. Its outlet is via the Snarumselva at the south end of the lake. Snarumselva flows into the Drammen River by Geithus in Modum.
 
At Noresund, along Norwegian National Road 7 (Rv7), there is a bridge over the lake.
Sole Hotel (Sole Hotell Krødsherad) is located along the national road between Krøderfjorden and Norefjell. Sole Hotel was originally a former doctor's home dating back to the beginning of the 1900s. In 1966, the facility opened as Norway's first conference hotel.

Etymology 
The Old Norse form of the name must have been *Krœðir. This name is probably derived from the verb kryda 'stream/press together' related to Old English crudan 'to press, push'. In that case the name is probably referring to the narrow strait of Noresund.

Gallery

See also
Krøderen Line

References

External links 

 Best Western Sole Hotell & Herregaard website

Lakes of Viken (county)
Krødsherad